HNLMS Van Galen may refer to following ships of the Royal Netherlands Navy:

 , a wooden hulled corvette
 , an 
 , the ex-HMS Noble
 , a 
 , a 

Royal Netherlands Navy ship names